D. Dornblüth & Sohn is a manufacturer of luxury hand-made wristwatches based in Kalbe, Germany. The company generally uses older equipment for the production of the watches, and annual production is approximately 120-180 pieces.

History
D. Dornblüth & Sohn was founded in 1999 by Dieter Dornblüth and his son Dirk. In 2002 the company released its first production model, based around a design Dieter Dornblüth had created 40 years earlier but had all but forgotten until Dirk presented him with a gift of a self-designed watch on his 60th birthday. The company enjoyed moderate growth over the following years, moving into a new workspace in 2003 which subsequently required further expansion in 2005 to keep up with demand. After restoring the chronometer of the Gorch Fock I in 2008, Dornblüth released a limited edition watch to commemorate the ship's 75th anniversary.
In 2012 the "Quintus", based around their fifth calibre, also their first in-house movement, was released.

See also
 List of German watch manufacturers

Further reading
 Braun, Peter (2015), Wristwatch Annual.  Abbeville Press.
 Brückner, Michael (2012), Uhren als Kapitalanlage: Status, Luxus, lukrative Investition. FinanzBuch Verlag.

References

Manufacturing companies established in 1999
Watch brands
Watch manufacturing companies of Germany
German companies established in 1999
Companies based in Saxony-Anhalt